Trachyspora is a genus of rust fungi in the family Phragmidiaceae. The genus, widespread in northern temperate areas, contains six species.

References

External links

Pucciniales
Taxa named by Karl Wilhelm Gottlieb Leopold Fuckel
Taxa described in 1861